OneVision was a consortium which was offered a licence by the Broadcasting Authority of Ireland to run the pay television services on the DTT platform in the Republic of Ireland.

OneVision was managed through a consortium made up of telecommunications company Eircom (65%), Arqiva (25%), Setanta (10%) and TV3 Group holding a nominal share.

OneVision had considered the feasibility of operating the commercial digital terrestrial television service  after Boxer Ireland decided to withdraw from the contract due to the then current economic climate in Ireland.

OneVision was unable to conclude negotiations with the BAI due to claimed difficulties with the terms of RTÉ NL apparently regarding multiplexing, marketing for DTT and other issues; and withdrew from the process. The licence offer was then made to Easy TV (DTT) the third placed consortium that included RTÉ and Liberty Global, who own the cable operator UPC.

EasyTV in turn rejected the licence. No further attempts have been made for commercial DTT licensing, with the Saorview system remaining the only DTT platform in Ireland.

Historical timeline
On 4 May 2008 Onevision announced that it would supply 6 channels for free alongside subscription based channels and the public service broadcasters
On 1 May 2009 Fintan Drury chairperson of the OneVision consortium announced that OneVision is to enter negotiations with the BCI) with the view to take over operations of the pay DTT service. If negotiations are deemed successful it may see the launch of DTT in late 2009/early 2010 at a proposed operation cost of €40 million. OneVision aspire to offer 23 channels coinciding with the free-to-air channels.
On 9 May 2009 as reported OneVision are likely to operate the pay DTT service. The official announcement will be made week beginning 11–15 May 2009.
On 11 May 2009 as reported OneVision are to operate the pay DTT service.
On 9 July 2009 it was confirmed that RTÉ will not launch its DTT service until other media partners are ready to launch the service. The original service was due to launch in September 2009.
On Friday, 28 August 2009 it was reported that the consortium behind One Vision are set to announce its future plans in September 2009. It was also reported that negotiations between BCI, RTÉ NL and One Vision (DTT) are progressing This however did not emerge later.
According to an article in The Sunday Business Post on 20 September 2009 both TV3 and Setanta are to take a lesser stake in Onevision. In the same article it stated that both Eircom and Arqiva are to increase their stake in the company. Such changes will only be granted based on regulations set out by the BCI. This could lead to further setbacks in the roll-out of DTT in Ireland. Also with the ongoing acquisition of Eircom by another company this could lead to further setbacks.
On Friday, 20 November 2009 Advanced Television.com reported that One Vision DTT have been given weeks to decide if they will sign off on the licence for 3 multiplexes for DTT with the Broadcasting Authority of Ireland or not. If OneVision is not forthcoming in ironing out remaining issues regarding the licence it is possible the BAI withdraw the DTT Licence offer and may then offer the licence to Easy TV.If One Vision signs then commercial DTT contracts with the BAI & RTÉ, plans may become more public  It would appear that the BAI is keen to avoid the long delay experienced with Boxer DTT Ireland.
On Friday, 4 December 2009 the Irish Times reported that progress has been made on the multiplexing annual costs that Onevision would pay RTÉ NL with a 20% reduction from €10 million to €8 million. However the security bond of €20 million is still a point of contention apparently and also a lack of commitment by the Irish Government to Analogue Switchover campaign marketing funding costs is also delaying sign-off. However, it seems OneVision are close to agreement, evident from the shareholding changes it proposes, if the security bond issue can be settled and the Government can give a commitment to a marketing contribution in a year's time.
On Tuesday, 22 December 2009 the Irish Independent reported the latest developments in relation to Onevision. They report that Eircom will become the main shareholder in the company. It is expected that the consortium behind the television provider and the Broadcasting Authority of Ireland will announce the companies future plans in March 2010.
Reports suggested that the future of One Vision would be decided upon at the BAI board meeting on 29 March 2010. This has transpired and the BAI have given One Vision 2 more weeks to indicate decisively whether or not One Vision will proceed to contract with the BAI and RTÉ. To aid in the resolution of remaining issues, the BAI has asked an independent 3rd party to review the documents regarding the issues (RTÉNL-One Vision negotiations) and to give its view (which will be non-binding on the parties), to it which it will communicate to the parties. The parties will then be required to give their final positions and One Vision will be required to agree those terms and proceed to contract completion or to indicate that it is not happy with the terms upon which the BAI is likely to close the contract licence with One Vision for non-completion and offer the licence to Easy TV.

References

External links
Eircom Website
Arqiva (Ireland) Website
TV3 Website
Setanta Sports Ireland

 
Television in the Republic of Ireland

no:Fjernsyn på Irland
sv:Television i Irland